Siah Gel (also Romanized as Sīāh Gel, Seyāh Gol, Sīāh Gol, and Sīyāh Gol) is a village in the Abanar Rural District, Kalat District, Abdanan County, Ilam Province, Iran. At the 2006 census, its population was 322, in 59 families. The village is populated by Lurs.

References 

Populated places in Abdanan County
Luri settlements in Ilam Province